

Siegfried Macholz (20 September 1890 – 25 May 1975) was a general in the Wehrmacht of Nazi Germany during World War II. He was a recipient of the Knight's Cross of the Iron Cross.

Awards and decorations

 German Cross in Gold on 19 December 1941 as Generalmajor and commander 122. Infanterie-Division
 Knight's Cross of the Iron Cross on 16 October 1944 as Generalleutnant and commander of 49. Infanterie-Division

References

Citations

Bibliography

 
 

1890 births
1975 deaths
Lieutenant generals of the German Army (Wehrmacht)
People from Klaipėda
People from East Prussia
German Army personnel of World War I
Prussian Army personnel
Recipients of the Gold German Cross
Recipients of the Knight's Cross of the Iron Cross
German prisoners of war in World War II held by the United Kingdom
German police officers
Recipients of the clasp to the Iron Cross, 1st class
German Army generals of World War II